The 2016–17 East Carolina Pirates men's basketball team represented East Carolina University during the 2016–17 NCAA Division I men's basketball season. The Pirates were led by seventh year head coach Jeff Lebo and played their home games at Williams Arena at Minges Coliseum as third year members of the American Athletic Conference. They finished the season 15–18, 6–12 in AAC play to finish in ninth place. They defeated Temple in the first round of the AAC tournament to advance to the quarterfinals where they lost to SMU.

On January 16, 2017, head coach Jeff Lebo underwent hip surgery and was unable to coach for the rest of the season. Assistant coach Michael Perry took over as acting head coach beginning with the January 22 game.

Previous season
The Pirates finished the 2015–16 season with a record of 12–20, 4–14 in AAC play to finish in a tie for ninth place in conference. They lost to South Florida in the first round of the AAC tournament.

Departures

Incoming Transfers

Incoming recruits

Recruiting class of 2017

Roster

Schedule and results

|-
!colspan=9 style=| Non-conference regular season

|-
!colspan=9 style=| AAC regular season

|-
!colspan=9 style=|AAC tournament

References

East Carolina Pirates men's basketball seasons
East Carolina
East Carolina Pirates
East Carolina Pirates